Why Survive? Being Old In America was written by Robert N. Butler and published by Harper & Row in 1975,  it won the 1976 Pulitzer Prize for General Non-Fiction. The book discusses a range of problems faced by older people in American society stemming from poverty, the failures of the Social Security system, and social isolation, and argues for the necessity of comprehensive reform and developing of a strategy for dealing with an aging population.

References

External links

1975 non-fiction books
Pulitzer Prize for General Non-Fiction-winning works
Harper & Row books
Books about the United States
Old age in the United States